Tauheedul Islam Boys' High School (TIBHS) is a secondary free school for  boys in Blackburn, Lancashire.

Background

TIBHS opened in September 2012 and received an "Outstanding" Ofsted inspection in 2014.

The school moved building to Shadsworth Road, and then permanently to Sumner Street in 2019. The new building is also planned to house the Tauheedul 6th Form.

This free school opened in September 2012 as part of the Tauheedul Free Schools Trust. It has not been previously inspected.

The school is smaller than the average-sized secondary school but a rapidly expanding 11–18 academy. Currently it has 254 students in Years 7, 8 and 9.

The school is housed temporarily in a former junior school building.

There are no public examination results by which to measure the school’s performance against the government’s current floor standards, which are the minimum expectations for students’ attainment and progress.

The school does not make use of alternative provision.

The leadership and management of the school are shared between a Chief Executive and an Executive Principal.

The school has a local governing body

Pupils

Nearly all students are of Asian heritage, mainly Indian or Pakistani. The proportion of students who speak English as an additional language is well above average.

The proportion of students known to be eligible for the pupil premium support is average. The pupil premium provides additional funding for students who are known to be eligible for free school meals, children from service families and children looked after by the local authority.

The proportion of students supported through school action is below average. The proportion of students supported at school action plus or with a statement of special educational needs is average.

References

Star Academies
Islamic schools in England
Secondary schools in Blackburn with Darwen
Free schools in England
Free Schools in England with a Formal Faith Designation
Boys' schools in Lancashire
Schools in Blackburn
Educational institutions established in 2012
2012 establishments in England